Caplen may refer to:

 Caplen, Texas, United States

People with the surname 
 Dan Caplen (born 1992), British R&B singer, songwriter and musician 
 Natasha J. Caplen, British-American geneticist
 Tom Caplen (1879–1945), English cricketer

See also
 Caplan (disambiguation)
 Kaplan (disambiguation)